Trismelasmos mixta is a moth in the family Cossidae. It is found in New Guinea and on the Moluccas.

References

Zeuzerinae
Moths described in 1888